Pieter Alex "Lex" van Kreuningen (born 29 September 1937) is a retired Dutch road cyclist who was active between 1959 and 1964. He competed at the 1960 Summer Olympics in the 100 km team time trial and individual road race and finished in fourth place in the time trial. He also won the Ronde van Limburg (1960) and Ronde van Nederland (1963), as well as two stages of the Tour de l'Avenir (1962 and 1963).

See also
 List of Dutch Olympic cyclists

References

1937 births
Living people
Olympic cyclists of the Netherlands
Cyclists at the 1960 Summer Olympics
Dutch male cyclists
Sportspeople from Utrecht (city)
Cyclists from Utrecht (province)
20th-century Dutch people